Chester-le-Street was a county constituency centred on the town of Chester-le-Street in County Durham.  It returned one Member of Parliament (MP) to the House of Commons of the Parliament of the United Kingdom from 1885 to 1983.

History

Creation 
The constituency was created for the 1885 general election by the Redistribution of Seats Act 1885 as one of eight new single-member divisions of the county of Durham, replacing the two 2-member seats of North Durham and South Durham. The seat covered a large area of north Durham, including areas which are now part of the Borough of Gateshead (Ryton, Blaydon and Whickham) and the City of Sunderland (Washington) in the metropolitan county of Tyne and Wear.

Boundaries

1885–1918 

 The Sessional Divisions of Chester-le-Street and Gateshead (part); and
 The Municipal Borough of Gateshead

NB included only non-resident freeholders in the parliamentary borough of Gateshead.

See map on Vision of Britain website.

1918–1950 

 The Urban District of Chester-le-Street; and
 the Rural District of Chester-le-Street.

The constituency was divided in two, with the areas comprising the urban districts of Ryton, Blaydon and Whickham forming the bulk of the new constituency of Blaydon. Gained Witton Gilbert from the abolished constituency of Mid Durham.

1950–1983 

 The Urban Districts of Chester-le-Street and Washington; and
 the Rural District of Chester-le-Street.

Minor changes to reflect changes in local authority boundaries; the urban district of Washington had been created in 1922 from the rural district of Chester-le-Street.

Abolition 
The seat was abolished for the 1983 general election as a result of the periodic review of parliamentary constituencies following the re-organisation of local government under the Local Government Act 1972. On abolition, the area which had comprised the new town of Washington was included in the new constituency of Houghton and Washington; the parishes of Birtley and Lamesley were transferred to Blaydon; and the remainder, comprising about half the electorate, becoming part of the re-established seat of North Durham.

Political history 
Chester-le-Street and its successor constituency (North Durham) have over 100 years of continuous Labour representation.

Members of Parliament

Election results

Elections in the 1880s

Elections in the 1890s

Elections in the 1900s

Elections in the 1910s 

General Election 1914–15:

Another General Election was required to take place before the end of 1915. The political parties had been making preparations for an election to take place and by the July 1914, the following candidates had been selected; 
Labour: John Gilliland

Elections in the 1920s

Elections in the 1930s

Election in the 1940s

Elections in the 1950s

Elections in the 1960s

Elections in the 1970s

See also 

 History of parliamentary constituencies and boundaries in Durham

References 

Parliamentary constituencies in County Durham (historic)
Constituencies of the Parliament of the United Kingdom established in 1885
Constituencies of the Parliament of the United Kingdom disestablished in 1983
Chester-le-Street